Viarmes is a commune in the Val-d'Oise department in Île-de-France in northern France. Viarmes station has rail connections to Luzarches, Sarcelles and Paris.

Population

Twin towns
Viarmes is currently twinned with Tubbercurry in County Sligo, Ireland. Viarmes is also twinned with Morcote, an Italian-speaking town in Switzerland.

See also
Communes of the Val-d'Oise department

References

External links
Official website 

Association of Mayors of the Val d'Oise 

Communes of Val-d'Oise